The 1968–69 SMU Mustangs men's basketball team represented Southern Methodist University during the 1968–69 men's college basketball season.

Schedule

References 

SMU Mustangs men's basketball seasons
SMU
SMU
SMU